The 2016–17 NBA Development League season was the 16th season of the NBA Development League (NBA D-League). The NBA D-League is the official minor league basketball organization owned by the National Basketball Association (NBA). The following season, the league was rebranded to NBA G League as part of multi-year partnership with Gatorade and its parent company, PepsiCo.

Transactions

Retirement 

 On July 4, 2015, Blake Ahearn was named the head coach of Clayton High School's boys basketball team, effectively ending his playing career. Ahearn played for 6 NBA D-League teams during his 8-year playing career, winning one championship with the Santa Cruz Warriors in 2015.

League changes
The league expanded to a record 22 teams for the 2016–17 season. Three expansion teams were introduced this season (Greensboro Swarm, Long Island Nets, and Windy City Bulls), each of them owned and affiliated with an NBA team. Along with these three new teams, the Bakersfield Jam were purchased by their 2015–16 affiliate, the Phoenix Suns, and relocated to become the Northern Arizona Suns. The Idaho Stampede, who were already owned by the Utah Jazz, were also relocated and became the Salt Lake City Stars. The Reno Bighorns were purchased by their NBA affiliate, the Sacramento Kings just prior to the start of the season. The addition of the three teams, as well as the purchases of existing teams, left just eight NBA teams without a D-League affiliate and only seven D-League teams not owned by an NBA team.

The league consists of two conferences, each with 11 teams split into two divisions, two with six and two with five. The Greensboro Swarm and Long Island Nets were placed into the Atlantic Division. The Raptors 905 moved from the Atlantic Division, along with the newly formed Windy City Bulls, to the Central Division. With the addition of the three expansion teams, to even out the conferences, the Iowa Energy and Sioux Falls Skyforce moved from the Central Division of the Eastern Conference to the Southwest Division of the Western Conference.

Regular season
Final standings.

Eastern Conference

Atlantic Division

Central Division

Western Conference

Southwest Division

Pacific Division

Playoffs
For the last time, the League held an eight-team bracket for the postseason. After the season, the League would shift from best-of-three postseason rounds to having it only be for the Finals (while retaining the arrangement of having the better seeded team host Game 2 and Game 3 if necessary).  Raptors 905 won the Finals in the final year of the league with the D League branding, winning over the Rio Grande Valley Vipers in three games. The Vipers won Game 1 119-106 before Raptors 905 won Game 2 95-85 and Game 3 122-96.

References

External links
Official website